is a Japanese figure skater.

He is the 2014 NHK Trophy champion, 2011 Ondrej Nepela Memorial champion, and 2009 Japan Junior bronze medalist.

Earlier in his career, he represented the United States, winning a bronze medal on the ISU Junior Grand Prix series and the 2006 U.S. junior national pewter medal.

In 2011, Murakami became the first to land the quad salchow jump in the men's category at the Japan Championships.

Personal life
Daisuke "Dice" Murakami was born on January 15, 1991, in Kanagawa, Japan.

His family moved to the United States in 2000 after winning a green-card lottery to become US residents.

Career

For the United States 
Murakami began skating at age ten, soon after moving to the U.S. He began competing on the juvenile level in 2001.

Representing the U.S., Murakami made his international debut in April 2004 at the Triglav Trophy, where he won the novice men's title. He received his first ISU Junior Grand Prix (JGP) assignments in autumn 2004. In the 2006–07 season, he won the bronze medal at his JGP event in Mexico.

For Japan 
Murakami made no international appearances during the 2007–08 season due to his switch to Japan. He was released at the start of the following season but could not compete at his first JGP assignment, in Mexico, due to a paperwork problem. He placed fourth at his next JGP event, in South Africa.

Making his senior international debut, Murakami placed 7th at the 2009 Finlandia Trophy and 9th at his first Grand Prix event, the 2009 NHK Trophy. In 2010, he parted ways with his coach, Nikolai Morozov, and relocated to Los Angeles, California to work with Frank Carroll. He won the bronze medal at the 2011 Winter Universiade in Turkey.

The following season, Murakami won gold at the 2011 Ondrej Nepela Memorial and 2011 Merano Cup. He finished sixth at the 2011 Skate America and 2011–12 Japanese Nationals.

Murakami began the 2012–13 season by winning the silver medal at 2012 Ondrej Nepela Memorial. He dislocated his right shoulder during competition at the 2012 NHK Trophy, forcing him to withdraw from the event. He also withdrew from the 2012–13 Japanese Nationals due to his recovery, but came back to finish the season with a bronze medal at the 2012 Triglav Trophy.

In the 2013–14 season, Murakami won both the Tokyo Regionals and the Eastern Sectionals. He then won the silver medal at 2013 Merano Cup. He came in tenth at the 2013–14 Japanese Nationals and finished the season with a gold medal at the Coupe du Printemps in Luxembourg.

On August 12, 2014, it was announced that Murakami had been selected as a host pick at the 2014 NHK Trophy. In September, he placed third in the 2014 U.S. International Classic at Salt Lake City, Utah. In November, he won the men's single event at the NHK Trophy, beating three skaters who qualified for the Grand Prix Final. At the 2015 Four Continents Championships in Seoul, Korea, he set personal best scores in all segments; he placed third in the free skate and fourth overall.

In the 2014–15 season, Murakami won the bronze medal at Grand Prix Skate Canada. He then was awarded the bronze medal at the 2015 Trophee Eric Bompard after placing third in the short program. The second day of competition was cancelled due to the November 2015 Paris attacks. Murakami qualified for the Grand Prix Final where he finished 6th. He was named as an alternate for the Japanese Olympic team

Programs

Competitive highlights
GP: Grand Prix; CS: Challenger Series; JGP: Junior Grand Prix

Results for Japan

Results for the United States

References

External links

 
 
 

American male single skaters
People from Greater Los Angeles
Japanese male single skaters
1991 births
Living people
Sportspeople from Kanagawa Prefecture
Universiade medalists in figure skating
Universiade bronze medalists for Japan
Competitors at the 2011 Winter Universiade